"My Big Fat Geek Wedding" is the seventeenth episode of the fifteenth season of the American animated television series The Simpsons. It first aired on the Fox network in the United States on April 18, 2004. The episode was originally planned to air on April 4, 2004, but due to the voice actors going on strike, Fox aired a rerun instead.

The story is a follow-up to the episode "Special Edna".

Plot
Love is in the air when Seymour Skinner and Edna Krabappel are finally getting married. They each have their bachelor party, with Edna having hers at the Simpson house with Duffman and a topless Chief Wiggum as strippers, and Principal Skinner having his at Moe's with Homer. However, at his party, Skinner admits that he has doubts about marrying Edna. When the wedding is held at Springfield Elementary's gymnasium, Edna learns that Skinner does not want to marry her. Picturing a future anniversary in which Skinner is still unable to commit, she runs away from the ceremony as Skinner tries to catch up with her while Nelson cannot bring himself to play a prank on her.

After the wedding is called off, Homer and Marge try to get Skinner and Edna to be engaged again, but it is halted by Homer and Marge's own marriage problems. Edna returns a wedding gift to the Comic Book Guy, and she finds him to be an interesting man. Homer gets Skinner to serenade Edna using a band made up of Bart, Milhouse, and Martin, but that fails when he learns that the Comic Book Guy and Edna are in love. The family goes to the Bi-Mon-Sci-Fi-Con to confront Comic Book Guy, where they see The Simpsons creator Matt Groening. Comic Book Guy, proposes to marry Edna, and the room is ready for a Star Trek-themed mock Klingon wedding ceremony. Skinner, dressed up as Catwoman (who he thought was Catman) battles the Comic Book Guy. Edna interrupts their fight to declare that she will not marry either man. When she tells the Comic Book Guy how they had fun but are very different, he accepts her decision, though Skinner is still upset. Later, at the Simpson house, Homer asks Marge to remarry him, which is conducted in the Klingon language, and she accepts (although she accidentally agrees to give their children a Klingon upbringing).

Reception

DVD Movie Guides Colin Jacobson said that he "never felt particularly interested in the Skinner/Edna relationship, so [the episode] falls in the red. It never quite rebounds from that deficit, as it fails to find much inspiration". He added that "A few laughs crop up along the way, but not enough to redeem it."

References

External links 
 

The Simpsons (season 15) episodes
2004 American television episodes
Television episodes about weddings